Saigon Passenger Transportation Company is a provider of public transport and hired shuttle services (for factories and schools) in Ho Chi Minh City, Vietnam.

Services

Satranco provides public transit services to a city of motorcycles and bicycles.

Satranco provides hired shuttle services to schools and factories in HCMC:

 Toshiba
 Fujifilm
 Panasonic
 XIMĂNG HÀ TIÊN 1
 THIẾT BỊ ĐIỆN 1
 XÍ NGHIỆP MAY 
 DA XUẤT KHẨU 30/4

Routes

Satranco offers public transit services within HCM City via various routes:

City Transit

 Bến Thành-TSN Airport bus route
 SàiGòn-Bình Tây bus route 
 Express bus for students/pupils
 Express bus for workers 
 # 7 GÒ VẤP - CHỢ LỚN
 # 41 VÒNG ĐẦM SEN - BÀU CÁT
 # 45 BẾN THÀNH - BẾN XE QUẬN 8
 # 27 BẾN THÀNH - ÂU CƠ - CHỢ TÂN XUÂN
 # 26 BẾN THÀNH - BẾN XE MIỀN ĐÔNG
 # 28 BẾN THÀNH - TÂN SƠN NHẤT
 # 152 BẾN THÀNH - SÂN BAY TÂN SƠN NHẤT
 # 11 SÀI GÒN - ĐẦM SEN
 # 1 SÀI GÒN - CHỢ BÌNH TÂY
 # 2 SÀI GÒN - BẾN XE MIỀN TÂY
 # 612 DĨ AN - BẾN XE MIỀN ĐÔNG
 # S4 KTX ĐHQG - BẾN XE MIỀN TÂY
 # 31 KHU DÂN CƯ -  TÂN QUY - KHU DÂN CƯ BÌNH LỢI
 # 42 CHỢ CẦU MUỐI - CHỢ TAM BÌNH
 # 148 BX MIỀN TÂY - GÒ VẤP
 # 38 KDC TÂN QUY - BẾN THÀNH - CV LÊ THỊ RIÊNG
 # 49 HỒ KỲ HOÀ - CHỢ LỚN - CHỢ BÌNH PHÚ
 # 142 BẾN THÀNH - NGUYỄN KHOÁI - CV TÔN THẤT THUYẾT
 # 139 LÊ HỒNG PHONG- BẾN XE MIỀN TÂY
 # 60 BẾN XE AN SƯƠNG - KCN VĨNH LỘC - KCN LÊ MINH XUÂN
 # 64 MIỀN ĐÔNG - ĐẦM SEN
 # 62 BẾN XE QUẬN 8 - LÀNG HOA GÒ VẤP
 # 70 MAXIMAX CỘNG HÒA - CHỢ XUÂN THỚI THƯỢNG
 # 71 AN SƯƠNG - PHẬT CÔ ĐƠN
 # 95 KCN TÂN BÌNH - BẾN XE MIỀN ĐÔNG
 # 91 BẾN XE MIỀN TÂY - CHỢ NÔNG SẢN THỦ ĐỨC
 # 93 BẾN THÀNH - LINH TRUNG
 # 96 BẾN THÀNH  - CHỢ LỚN - CHỢ BÌNH ĐIỀN
Suburban Services

Satranco also operates suburban-transnational and interprovincial bus service:

 International route TP. HCM - PHNOMPENH (Cambodia)
 HCM City - Quảng Nam - inter-provincial
 HCM City – Đà Nẵng - inter-provincial
 THCM City - Nha Trang - inter-provincial

Charters

Chartered Services are provided for tour groups in and around HCM City.

Fleet
Satranco has a fleet of 400 buses:

 Mercedes-Benz Conecto H rural service bus
 Isuzu Samco bus - based on Egra Mio medium-duty buses
 Transinco 1 5 K30HFC - based on Toyota Coaster minibus

References
 Satranco Routes

Bus companies of Vietnam
Transport in Ho Chi Minh City
Road transport in Ho Chi Minh City
Public transport in Ho Chi Minh City